Casuarina is an electoral division of the Legislative Assembly in Australia's Northern Territory. It was first created in 1974 and was named after the adjacent suburb of Casuarina. Casuarina is an entirely urban electorate, covering only 12 km2 and taking in the suburbs of Brinkin, Nakara, Tiwi and part of Alawa, as well as the Charles Darwin University. There were 5,647 people enrolled in the electorate as of August 2020.

For the first three decades of its existence, Casuarina, like most seats in the Darwin area, was a stronghold for the Country Liberal Party. Clare Martin did nearly manage to take the seat for the Labor Party upon the retirement of long-serving CLP member Nick Dondas in 1994, but lost out to the CLP's Peter Adamson, who held the seat for the next seven years. It was still widely presumed to be a safe Liberal seat in 2001, when it unexpectedly fell to Labor challenger Kon Vatskalis as part of Labor's sweep of the northern suburbs that year en route to winning government for the first time.  Vatskalis easily retained the seat in 2005, 2008, and 2012. He resigned on 18 September 2014, which triggered a by-election. It was won by Labor candidate Lauren Moss with a reduced margin. Moss picked up enough of a swing in 2016 to make Casuarina much more secure for Labor, and consolidated her hold on the seat in 2020; the CLP now needs a swing of 15.9 percent to win it.

Members for Casuarina

Election results

References

External links
 Division profile from the Northern Territory Electoral Commission

Casuarina